Charles W. Vermillion (November 6, 1866 – September 2, 1927) was a justice of the Iowa Supreme Court from November 15, 1923, to September 3, 1927, appointed from Appanoose County, Iowa.

Born at Centerville, Iowa, Vermillion received degrees from  DePauw University and the University of Michigan.

In 1923, Governor Nathan E. Kendall appointed Vermillion to a seat on the Iowa Supreme Court vacated by the death of Silas M. Weaver. Vermillion took his oath of office on November 15, 1923. Vermillion was then elected to the remainder of the term.

He died at the age of 60 in a Des Moines hospital, ten days after undergoing kidney surgery.

References

External links

1866 births
1927 deaths
People from Centerville, Iowa
DePauw University alumni
Justices of the Iowa Supreme Court